Act of Vengeance may refer to:
 Act of Vengeance (1986 film), a television movie starring Charles Bronson
 Act of Vengeance (1974 film), an American exploitation film
 Five Minarets in New York, also known as Act of Vengeance, a Turkish-American action film

See also
 Acts of Vengeance, a comic book crossover storyline
 Acts of Vengeance, a 2017 action thriller film